Mehmet Cansun (born 1947 in Istanbul) is a Turkish businessman and former chairman of the Turkish sports club Galatasaray.

He works in advertising industry as the owner of Kamera Reklam Group. 

In 2001, he was elected as the president of Galatasaray. In the congress held in 2002, Özhan Canaydın won the election ahead of him.

See also
 List of Galatasaray S.K. presidents

References
 http://www.galatasaray.org/English/Corporate/history/baskanlar.asp

1947 births
Living people
Businesspeople from Istanbul
Galatasaray S.K. presidents